Adam Crowl is the former Director of Icarus Interstellar, an international non-profit organization that aims to achieve interstellar travel by 2100, as well as Team Leader for Project Icarus's Main Propulsion Module. Crowl is also a member on the Starship Congress Committee, a designer on the Project Forward Beamed Propulsion project, as well a designer on Project Tin Tin. In 2012, he proposed a mission for a spaceship that involves sending embryos into space to be raised by androids.

Personal life 
Crowl was born in Bendigo, Australia, in 1970. He holds a BSc at the University of Queensland.

References 

Living people
Year of birth missing (living people)